The NRL Judiciary is the disciplinary judiciary of the National Rugby League (NRL), a rugby league competition. The Judiciary regulates the on-field conduct of players from NRL clubs.

Due to changes announced on the eve of the 2022 NRL season, the NRL Judiciary is made up of former players who convene in two-man panels to rule on on-field incidents. The judiciary has been chaired by Supreme Court of NSW Justice Geoffrey Bellew since 2015. Bellew has the deciding vote should the panel's verdict not be unanimous.

From 2022, the Match Review Committee deciding on whether charges are issued against players for on-field conduct is managed by former NRL player and video referee Luke Patten.

An integrity unit was formed on 7 February 2013 and is headed by former Federal Court judge Tony Whitlam.

Penalties Table
Updated for 2022 NRL season.

Previous points table
System in place from 1998-2021, this version from 2017-2021.
100 points = 1 match suspension

History

Suspensions

NRL records
Source:

See also

AFL Tribunal
List of players sent off in National Rugby League matches

Notes

References

External links

National Rugby League
NRL Women's Premiership
Judiciaries
Sports law